William Collier Jr. (born Charles F. Gall Jr.; February 12, 1902 – February 5, 1987) was an American stage performer, producer, and a film actor who in the silent and sound eras was cast in no fewer than 89 motion pictures.

Biography
William Collier (nicknamed "Buster") was born in New York City. When his parents divorced, his mother, the actress Paula Marr, remarried the actor William Collier Sr. who adopted Charles (the two did share a resemblance) and gave the boy the new name William Collier Jr. Collier's acting experience in childhood, having first appeared on stage at age seven, helped him get his first movie role at age 14 in The Bugle Call (1916).

In 1910 his parents were appearing in Denver and Collier was hospitalized with scarlet fever, which was followed by typhoid, but he eventually recovered by the end of the summer and was able to join his parents who were appearing at Elitch Theatre. He appeared in his father's show, The Patriot, as Kid Sugar.

He later became a popular leading man in the 1920s and successfully made the transition from silent into sound film. Nevertheless, he retired from acting in 1935, and in 1937 traveled to England to work as a movie producer. He returned to the United States in the late 1940s and began producing drama series for television. In February 1960, in recognition of his contributions to the entertainment industry, Collier received a star on the Hollywood Walk of Fame.

Collier died in San Francisco on February 5, 1987, just a week before his 85th birthday.

Selected filmography as an actor

 The Bugle Call (1916) - Billy Andrews
 Never Again (1916, Short)
 Back Stage (1919, Short) - Minor Role (uncredited)
 The Servant Question (1920) - Jack Merrick
 The Soul of Youth (1920) - Dick Armstrong
 Everybody's Sweetheart (1920) - John
 The Heart of Maryland (1921) - Lloyd Calvert
 The Girl from Porcupine (1921) - Jim McTvish
 At the Stage Door (1921) - Arthur Bates
 Cardigan (1922) - Michael Cardigan
 The Good Provider (1922) - Izzy Binswanger
 The Secrets of Paris (1922) - François
 Enemies of Women (1923) - Gaston
 Sinner or Saint (1923) - Young Artist
 Loyal Lives (1923) - Terrence
 The Age of Desire (1923) - Ranny - Age 21
 Pleasure Mad (1923) - Howard Benton
 Leave It to Gerry (1924) - Dan Forbes
 Fools Highway (1924) - Max Davidson
 The Sea Hawk (1924) - Marsak
 Wine of Youth (1924) - Max Cooper
 The Mine with the Iron Door (1924) - Chico
 Great Diamond Mystery (1924) - Perry Standish
 The Lighthouse by the Sea (1924) - Bob Dorn
 The Devil's Cargo (1925) - John Joyce
 The Reckless Sex (1925) - Juan
 Eve's Secret (1925) - Pierre
 The Verdict (1925) - Jimmy Mason
 Playing with Souls (1925) - Matthew Dale Jr.
 The Wanderer (1925) - Jether
 The Lucky Lady (1926) - Clarke
 The Rainmaker (1926) - Bobby Robertson
 The Lady of the Harem (1926) - Rafi
 God Gave Me Twenty Cents (1926) - Barney Tapman
 Just Another Blonde (1926) - Scotty
 The Broken Gate (1927) - Don Lane
 Backstage (1927) - Owen Mackay
 Convoy (1927) - John Dodge
 The Sunset Derby (1927) - Jimmy Burke
 Dearie (1927) - Stephen Darling
 Stranded (1927) - Johnny Nash
 The Desired Woman (1927) - Lieutenant Larry Trent
 The College Widow (1927) - Billy Bolton
 So This Is Love? (1928) - Jerry McGuire
 The Tragedy of Youth (1928) - Dick Wayne
 A Night of Mystery (1928) - Jérôme D'Egremont
 The Lion and the Mouse (1928) - Jefferson Ryder
 Women They Talk About (1928) - Steve Harrison
 Beware of Bachelors (1928) - Ed
 The Floating College  (1928) - George Dewey
 The Red Sword (1929) - Paul
 One Stolen Night (1929) - Bob
 Tide of Empire (1929) - Romauldo Guerrero
 Hardboiled Rose (1929) - Edward Malo
 The Donovan Affair (1929) - Cornish
 The Bachelor Girl (1929) - Jimmy
 New Orleans (1929) - Billy Slade
 Two Men and a Maid (1929) - Jim Oxford
 The College Coquette (1929) - Tom Marion
 The Show of Shows (1929) - Performer in 'Bicycle Built for Two' Number
 Lummox (1930) - Wally Wallenstein
 The Melody Man (1930) - Al Tyler
 A Royal Romance (1930) - John Hale
 New Movietone Follies of 1930 (1930) - Conrad Sterling
 Rain or Shine (1930) - Bud Conway
 The March of Time (1930) - Himself
 Reducing (1931) - Johnnie Beasley
 Little Caesar (1931) - Tony Passa
 Cimarron (1931) - The Kid
 Broadminded (1931) - Jack Hackett
 Bought (1931) - Reporter (uncredited)
 Street Scene (1931) - Sam Kaplan
 The Big Gamble (1931) - Johnnie Ames
 Sporting Chance (1931) - Terry Nolan
 Soul of the Slums (1931) - Jerry Harris
 The Secret Witness (1931) - Arthur Jones - aka Casey
 Dancers in the Dark (1932) - Floyd Stevens
 The County Fair (1932) - Jimmie Dolan
 The Phantom Express (1932) - Bruce Harrington
 Exposed (1932) - Jim Harper
 The Fighting Gentleman (1932) - Jack Duncan aka The Fighting Gentleman
 Speed Demon (1932) - 'Speed' Morrow
Behind Jury Doors (1932) - Steve Mannon
 File 113 (1933) - Prosper Botomy
 Forgotten (1933) - Joseph Meyers
 The Story of Temple Drake (1933) - Toddy Gowan
Her Secret (1933) - Johnny Norton
 Public Stenographer (1934) - James 'Jimmy' Martin Jr.
 The People's Enemy (1935) - Tony Falcone (final film role)

References

Bibliography 
John Holmstrom, The Moving Picture Boy: An International Encyclopaedia from 1895 to 1995, Norwich, Michael Russell, 1996, p. 16.

External links

 
 
 William Collier at Virtual History

American male stage actors
American male film actors
American male silent film actors
1902 births
1987 deaths
20th-century American male actors
Male actors from New York City
20th-century American singers